Ernest Baird (1930 – September 2003) was a politician in Northern Ireland. Baird was born in County Donegal
in the Irish Free State but moved with his family to Belfast at an early age.

A pharmacist and political unionist, Baird became the deputy leader of the Vanguard Progressive Unionist Party.  He was elected at the 1973 Northern Ireland Assembly election for Fermanagh and South Tyrone, and won a seat in the same constituency on the Northern Ireland Constitutional Convention.

When William Craig, the leader of Vanguard, proposed forming a coalition government with the nationalist Social Democratic and Labour Party, Baird led the majority of Vanguard in leaving to form the United Ulster Unionist Movement.

Baird became the leader of the new grouping, which initially pursued a policy of uniting all unionist groups to form a new party.  When this proved impossible, it instead constituted itself as the United Ulster Unionist Party (UUUP), again with Baird as the leader.  He then became a key member of the United Unionist Action Council

Baird stood for the UUUP in Fermanagh and South Tyrone at the 1979 general election, but won only 17% of the vote, taking fourth position in the poll.  At the 1982 Northern Ireland Assembly election, he fared even less well, taking only 2,022 first preference votes.

Sometime after this poor performance, the UUUP was dissolved.  Baird then confined his politics to the Orange Order, while building up his "Baird's Chemists" chain that became one of Northern Ireland's leading chemists chain, before being bought over in 2011.

References

Bibliography
Fermanagh and South Tyrone 1973-1982
CAIN Web Service: Abstracts on Organisations - 'U'
"Veteran unionist Baird dies after long illness", Belfast Telegraph

1930 births
2003 deaths
Leaders of political parties in Northern Ireland
Members of the Northern Ireland Assembly 1973–1974
Members of the Northern Ireland Constitutional Convention
United Ulster Unionist Party politicians
Vanguard Unionist Progressive Party politicians